High Society is the second album from the Welsh drum and bass producer High Contrast, released in 2004 on the Hospital Records label.

Track listing 
 Lovesick  – 7:14
 Tutti Frutti  – 6:06
 High Society (featuring Dynamite MC)  – 5:25
 Brief Encounter  – 5:44
 Racing Green – 6:46
 Angels and Fly (featuring NoLay) – 5:12
 Natural High  – 6:25
 The Persistence of Memory  – 6:29
 Twilight's Last Gleaming  – 7:36
 Only Two Can Play (featuring Spoonface) – 4:32
 Yesterday's Colours  – 5:50
 The Basement Track  – 5:41

References 

High Contrast albums
2004 albums
Hospital Records albums